() is a large fjord in the Westfjords region of Iceland. "" is the genitive case of "", the name of the first settler of the fjord.

Description
It branches into two main bays, both containing a few coves. The largest settlement on the fjord is the small village of Bíldudalur. Lowland strips along the bay are very limited, with mountain slopes falling steeply into the sea in most places.

Legends
According to folklore, the fjord is said to house the most sea monsters of all the country's fjords, and to have many sorcerers.

References

External links
Arnarfjordur - West fjords

Fjords of Iceland
Westfjords